Photograbber (original title Photomateurs) is an 18-minute French live action short film (with English subtitles) written and directed by Pascal Tosi.

Synopsis 

Set in 1952, this is a tale about a unique camera that captures reality. When the photos rebel against the photographer (a charming, henpecked toymaker) a battle begins.

Cast and characters 

Michel Crémadès (Marcel)
Christine Melcer (Carole)
Catherine Cyler (Marie)

Technical team 

 Director : Pascal Tosi
 Produced by : Aton Soumache
 Director of photography : Juan Diego Solanas
 Editing : Sylviane Gozin
 Set decorator : Frank Muller
 Executive in Charge of Production : Jean-Frédéric Samie
 Digital visual effects director : Hugues Namur
 Special Effects : Sparx*

Awards 

 ReelHeART International Film Festival (June 2006) : 1st place short film

Official selections 
 Golden Horse Film Festival - Digital Shorts Competition Taiwan (November 2005)
 Puchon International Fantastic Film Festival South Korea (July 2005)
 Fantasporto Portugal (March 2005)
 Santa Barbara International Film Festival USA (January 2005)
 Foyle Film Festival - Seagate Northern Ireland (November 2004)

References

External links 
 Official Photograbber website
 
 UniFrance web site

French short films
2004 films
Films set in 1952
2000s French films